United Arab Emirates Standard Time or UAE Standard Time is the time zone for the UAE. It is given by Gulf Standard Time, being 4 hours ahead of GMT/UTC (UTC+04:00) and is co-linear with neighbouring Oman. The UAE does not change clocks for daylight saving time.

IANA time zone database
The IANA time zone database contains one zone for the UAE in the file zone.tab, named "Asia/Dubai".

References